Stafford's Grocery, at 201 Main St. in Winifred, Montana, was built in 1914.  It was listed on the National Register of Historic Places in 2016.

It was deemed notable "as the only remaining building in Winifred constructed of native sandstone. It serves as a good example of a simple Western Commercial style building that retains its decorative elements including a projecting cornice along with a colored prism glass transom."

References

		
National Register of Historic Places in Fergus County, Montana
Commercial buildings completed in 1914
Grocery store buildings
Retail buildings in Montana
Sandstone buildings in the United States
1914 establishments in Montana